Eilean Mòr is an uninhabited island in Loch Dunvegan in north west Skye, Scotland. At low water the island is connected to Eilean Dubh.

Footnotes

Uninhabited islands of Highland (council area)